Ponte das Caínheiras is a masonry bridge in the civil parish of Castro Laboreiro e Lamas de Mouro, municipality of Melgaço, in the district of Viana do Castelo, on the narrow traffic area over the Rio das Caínheiras.

Locals often refer to the bridge as "O Diabo" (The Devil) owing to the frequent traffic tie-ups attempting to cross it.

History

The first reference to the bridge occurred on 11 May 1758 by Father Inácio Ribeiro Marques, in the Memórias Paroquiais of the parish. It is likely that the bridge was constructed at the end of the 18th century or beginning of the 19th century.

Architecture
The bridge is situated in a rural area harmoniously implanted within the Peneda-Gerês National Park. The bridge of Cainheiras is part of a network of vicinal roads south and east of Castro Laboreiro, in addition to the Minhoto-Galacia regional roadways that connected Castro Laboreiro with Melgaço, Arcos de Valdevez and Bande. Further, it connected Castro Laboreiro with Galicia to the east, in the direction of Celanova (through Portos and Seara) and south towards Entrimo and Lobios (through Ameixoeira).

It is an arched bridge, with soft incline, over two arcs with long, regular staves, reinforced by triangular cutwaters. On the ramp are large rectangular stone blocks that act as railing. It is proceeded by a gentle incline from a curvilinear bend in the road on both sides. The arches are slightly uneven with a  diameter, supported by long, regular staves. Between either arch are reinforcements: upstream, triangular cutwater and, downstream, rectangular struts. The ramp slabs are protected by guardrails formed by large blocks, reinforced by iron "staples".

References

Notes

Sources

See also
List of bridges in Portugal

Bridges in Viana do Castelo District
Buildings and structures in Melgaço, Portugal
Castro Laboreiro